Reproduction may mean:

Reproduction, the biological process by which new individual organisms are produced
Asexual reproduction, where an organism creates a copy of itself; there is no genetic contribution from another organism
Sexual reproduction, where two organisms contribute genetic material in the creation of a new individual organism
Self-replication, mechanical, memetic and other form of self-replication
Reproduction (economics), in Marxian economics, recurrent (or cyclical) processes by which the initial conditions necessary for economic activity to occur are constantly re-created
Reproducibility, the ability for a scientific experiment to be performed multiple times
Reproduction Auto parts, remanufacturing of obsolete automotive spares
Social (or cultural) reproduction, a sociological phenomenon
Sound reproduction, audio recording and replay
Reproduction (journal)

Entertainment
Reproduction (album), a 1979 album by British electronic band The Human League
Reproductions (album), a 2007 album by singer Charlotte Martin
Reproduction (novel), a 2019 novel by Ian Williams

See also
Copy (disambiguation)